The 2012 United States presidential election in Missouri took place on November 6, 2012, as part of the 2012 United States presidential election, in which all 50 states plus the District of Columbia participated. Missouri voters chose 10 electors to represent them in the Electoral College via a popular vote pitting incumbent Democratic President Barack Obama and his running mate, Vice President Joe Biden, against Republican challenger and former Massachusetts Governor Mitt Romney and his running mate, Congressman Paul Ryan.

Missouri was won by Romney, who took 53.76% of the vote to Obama's 44.38%, a margin of 9.38%. Although it was a battleground in past elections, and even a bellwether up until 2008, the Show-Me State was and still is considered to be trending toward the GOP, having been the only long-time swing state to be won (albeit narrowly) by Republican John McCain in 2008. Consequently, the state was not heavily contested by either side in 2012, and Romney ultimately carried Missouri by the largest margin since Ronald Reagan's 1984 landslide.  Romney ultimately became the second Republican ever to carry Missouri and lose the presidency after John McCain.

As of 2020, this is the last time Missouri was decided by a single-digit margin. In addition, this was the third time since 1900 that Missouri was not carried by the victor of the presidential contest two times consecutively, after Obama had failed to win the state in 2008, as well as the first time since 1900 when the overall loser of the presidential election won the state by a margin larger than 1% of the statewide vote. Thus, the 2012 election seemingly marked the end of Missouri's swing state status. It was also the last time Missouri voted to the left of Texas, and the first time since 1980 that it voted to the right of Georgia, both of which are Southern states that had long been Republican strongholds at the time. It is also the last time Missouri voted to the left of South Carolina and Alaska, further highlighting its transformation into a heavily Republican state. Obama is the only president of either party since William McKinley to win two terms in the White House without carrying Missouri either time. This election also remains the only time in history that a Democrat was elected twice to the presidency without ever carrying Missouri. 

Obama carried only three counties and the City of St. Louis. He carried Boone County, home to Columbia and the University of Missouri; Jackson County, where most of Kansas City is located; and St. Louis County, home to many St. Louis suburbs. While Obama won many counties in the St. Louis metropolitan area in 2008 such as Iron, Jefferson, Ste. Genevieve, and Washington counties, the Republicans won them in this election, all but Ste. Genevieve by comfortable margins.

Primaries

Democratic

Republican

The 2012 Missouri Republican presidential primary took place on February 7 and the caucuses ran from March 15 to March 24, 2012, except for one rescheduled for April 10. The primary election did not determine which delegates will be sent to the national convention; this is instead determined indirectly by the caucuses and directly by the Missouri Republican congressional-district conventions April 21 and the state convention June 2.

The unusual situation of having both the primary election and the caucus for the same party in the same election year in Missouri arose as a result of a change in the nominating rules of the Republican Party. State primaries in Missouri were previously held in early February. In September 2008, the Republican National Committee adopted a set of rules which included a provision that no states except Iowa, New Hampshire, South Carolina, and Nevada were allowed to begin the process of delegate selection (including binding primary elections) before the first Tuesday in March of an election year. In 2011, the Republican-controlled Missouri General Assembly attempted to move the primary election to mid-March, but the bill was vetoed by Democratic Governor Jay Nixon because of a provision limiting his power to fill vacancies in statewide elected offices. In a compromise solution, it was decided that Republican primary election would be made non-binding and instead delegates would be nominated by separate caucuses in late March, a move estimated to cost the state $7–8 million.

This marks the first time since 1996 that Missouri Republicans used a caucus system to nominate delegates to the Republican National Convention.

Primary
The primary was not to affect the selection of Missouri's delegates to the 2012 Republican National Convention, so it had no official effect on the nomination and was widely described beforehand as a "beauty contest". However it was seen as an opportunity for Rick Santorum to face off against Mitt Romney due to the absence of Newt Gingrich, who missed the filing deadline and was not on the ballot. Santorum was the only candidate to actively campaign in the state ahead of the primary.

The primary election was won by Santorum, who also won the Colorado and Minnesota Republican caucuses held that day.

There were 326,438 total votes cast by party ballot (including votes for Democratic, Libertarian and Constitution Party candidates), a turnout of 7.99% of 4,085,582 registered voters. Noting the low Republican turnout, NPR found voters apathetic because the primary was nonbinding.

Caucuses

The county caucuses elect delegates to congressional district conventions and the Missouri Republican Party state convention, which in turn elect 49 of Missouri's 52 delegates to the national convention. However, no straw poll is released to indicate levels of support to the general public. According to the state party, "Caucus-goers will be voting for delegates, and with few exceptions, these delegates will not be bound to a particular candidate. Because there is no vote on candidate preference, neither the Missouri GOP nor any election authority will have or release any data regarding the 'winner' of the caucuses."

Despite the nonbinding nature of the February primary, caucuses had the option to use its result as the basis for delegate allocation. Santorum was to appear personally at some caucuses, which The New York Times described as "part of the campaign's county-by-county strategy to try to outflank Mr. Romney and catch him in the delegate race".

Results
The county caucuses elect delegates to the congressional district conventions and the state convention. Delegates to the national convention will be elected at each of those conventions. Typically, the body of a caucus votes on slates of delegates prepared by leaders of factions and coalitions within the caucus.

The following table shows who won the majority or plurality of delegates for each county according to available unofficial reports.

By number of counties won

Ry county

Notes

Controversies

There were controversies surrounding the caucuses in Clay and Cass counties. The Missouri Republican Party ruled later that the slates of delegates elected at those caucuses were valid. A do-over caucus was required in St. Charles County after the first attempt disbanded over a rules dispute. Controversy also arose at the Jefferson County caucus, and a challenge was filed but later withdrawn.

District and state conventions
The following table shows who won the national delegates for each congressional district and statewide.

General election

Results

Results by county

Counties that flipped from Democratic to Republican 

 Buchanan (largest city: St. Joseph)
 Iron (largest city: Ironton)
 Jefferson (largest city: Arnold)
 Sainte Genevieve (largest city: Ste. Genevieve)
 Washington (largest city: Potosi)

By congressional district
Romney won 6 of 8 congressional districts.

See also
 2012 Democratic Party presidential primaries
 2012 Republican Party presidential debates and forums
 2012 Republican Party presidential primaries
 Results of the 2012 Republican Party presidential primaries
 Missouri Republican Party
 Missouri Bellwether
 United States presidential elections in Missouri

References

External links
The Green Papers: for Missouri
The Green Papers: Major state elections in chronological order
Official Election Returns Presidential Preference Primary, February 7, 2012. Missouri Secretary of State website
Missouri State Association of Parliamentarians(MSAP)

Missouri
United States President
2012